The Oceania Rugby Under 20 Championship is an international rugby union competition organised by Oceania Rugby, which is the regional governing body for rugby in Oceania. It is contested by men's junior national teams with an under-20 age requirement, and played as two tournaments: the Oceania Championship for teams that qualify for the World Championship; and the Oceania Trophy for teams aiming to compete in the World Rugby Under 20 Trophy.

History
This event replaced Oceania's former age-grade competition, the Oceania Under 19 Rugby Championship.

A planned tournament for a further six national under 20 sides was postponed, until December 2015. However,  and  participated in the Australian Under 20 Rugby Championship to prepare for the 2015 World Rugby Under 20 Trophy.

Teams
The teams for the Oceania Rugby Under 20 tournaments, as of 2022, were:

Championship

Trophy

Tournament winners

Championship

Trophy

Notes
 The Oceania U20 Trophy is traditionally held in November or December. There was no tournament in 2019 due to the event being pushed back by several months into 2020 to be closer to the World U20 Trophy.

See also 
 World Rugby Under 20 Championship
 World Rugby Under 20 Trophy
 Pacific Rugby Challenge
 Oceania Rugby Cup

References

External links 
 Oceania Rugby official website

 
Rugby union competitions in Oceania for national teams
2015 establishments in Oceania
Recurring sporting events established in 2015
Under-20 rugby union competitions